Aaron S. Merrill, US Navy rear admiral during World War II
Amanda Merrill, American Democratic member of the New Hampshire Senate 
Ayres Phillips Merrill (1825-1883), American planter and diplomat
Beverly Ann Merrill, star of The Real Housewives of New Jersey
Charles E. Merrill, American philanthropist, stockbroker, and co-founder of Merrill Lynch
Charles E. Merrill Jr., American educator
Dina Merrill (1923-2017), American actress
Elmer Drew Merrill, botanist
Elmer Truesdell Merrill, classical scholar
Estelle M. H. Merrill (pen name, Jean Kincaid; 1858–1908), journalist, editor
Eugene H. Merrill (academic)
Eugene H. Merrill (politician)
Forrest Merrill (born 1996), American football player
Frank Merrill, US Army major general; commander of Merrill's Marauders
Frank Thayer Merrill (1848-1936), American illustrator 
Gary Merrill (1915–1990), American actor
George F. Merrill, American politician
George P. Merrill, American chemist, geologist and pedologist, winner of the 1922 J. Lawrence Smith Medal
Helen Merrill, American Jazz vocalist
Helen Maud Merrill (1865–1943), American litterateur, poet
Herbert A. Merrill (1855–1926), American dentis
Herbert M. Merrill (1871–1956), New York Socialist assemblyman 1912
James Merrill, American poet
James Griswold Merrill, American Congregational minister and university administrator
Jan Merrill, American middle distance runner 
Jenny B. Merrill (1854–1934), American educator, author
John Merrill (disambiguation), multiple people
Katherine Merrill (1876–1962), American artist
Kieth Merrill, American filmmaker
Lewis Merrill, US Army officer in civil war; later fought against KKK.
Merrill Ashley (born 1950), American ballet dancer and répétiteur born Linda Michelle Merrill
Lorenzo Merrill, American politician
Lou Merrill, American actor
Margaret Manton Merrill (1859–1893), British-American journalist, writer, translator, elocutionist
Maud A. Merrill, American psychologist
Monique Merrill, American ski mountaineer
Nathaniel Merrill, American stage director and opera director
Orsamus Cook Merrill, American politician
Paul W. Merrill (1887–1961), American astronomer
Philip Merrill, American diplomat, publisher, banker, and philanthropist
Richard B. Merrill, American inventor of Foveon X3 sensor
Robert Merrill, American operatic baritone singer
Russel Merrill, US Navy pilot during World War I, and pioneer of aviation in Alaska
Samuel Merrill (disambiguation), multiple people
Stephen Merrill (disambiguation), multiple people
Thomas W. Merrill, American legal scholar
Wayne R. Merrill, United States Navy submarine commander in World War II